Witch Doctor is a live album by American jazz trumpeter Chet Baker which was recorded at The Lighthouse in Hermosa Beach in 1953 and released on the Contemporary label in 1985.

Reception

Rick Anderson of Allmusic states, "this disc finds Baker playing well, if not very consistently, and features a shifting group behind him...  There are better introductions to the Lighthouse sound, but this album is sure to please Chet Baker fans".

Track listing
 "Loaded" (Bernard Miller) - 7:50
 "I'll Remember April" (Gene de Paul, Patricia Johnston, Don Raye) - 11:51  
 "Winter Wonderland" (Felix Bernard, Richard B. Smith) - 4:20
 "Pirouette" (Shorty Rogers) - 7:47
 "Witch Doctor" (Bob Cooper) - 9:09

Personnel
Chet Baker - trumpet
Rolf Ericson - trumpet (tracks 1, 2, 4 & 5)
Bud Shank - alto saxophone, baritone saxophone (tracks 1, 2, 4 & 5)
Jimmy Giuffre (tracks 1 & 2), Bob Cooper (tracks 4 & 5) - tenor saxophone 
Russ Freeman (tracks 1-3), Claude Williamson (tracks 4 & 5) - piano  
Howard Rumsey - bass
Shelly Manne (tracks 4 & 5), Max Roach (tracks 1-3) - drums

References

1985 live albums
Albums recorded at the Lighthouse Café
Chet Baker live albums
Contemporary Records live albums